The 1972 Women's College World Series (WCWS) was contested among 16 college softball teams on May 18–21 in Omaha, Nebraska. This fourth WCWS was notable for the only appearance of a team from outside the United States, as the team from Tokyo–Nihon University of Japan proved  to be a hit with both spectators and the other teams in the tournament. Three-time defending champion John F. Kennedy College was excluded from the tournament by an organizational rule change the previous month. The new rule prohibited a team from appearing in the WCWS if it gave scholarships to any women athletes, not just softball players (JFK College openly awarded women's basketball scholarships). JFK never returned to the WCWS, and the school closed just three years later.

Teams
The double elimination tournament included these teams:

 Arizona State
 Central Missouri State College
 Illinois State
 Kansas State Teachers College (now Emporia State)
 Keene State College (New Hampshire)
 Luther College (Iowa)
 Minot State College (North Dakota)
 Nebraska–Omaha
 Northern Colorado
 Purdue (Indiana)
 South Carolina
 South Dakota State
 Southwest Missouri State
 Tokyo–Nihon University (Japan)
 Wayne State College (Nebraska)
 Western Illinois

The Arizona State Sun Devilettes defeated Tokyo–Nihon narrowly in the winners' bracket semi-final, 2–1, and split the tournament final, 0–1 and 8–5, with the if-necessary game requiring 11 innings.

Bracket

Source:

Ranking

See also

References

Women's College World Series
Soft
Women's College World Series
Women's College World Series
Women's College World Series
Women's sports in Nebraska